Avice Meya (born 2 December 1994) is a Ugandan swimmer. She competed in the women's 50 metre freestyle event at the 2017 World Aquatics Championships. She also competed in two events at the 2018 Commonwealth Games. In 2019, she represented Uganda at the 2019 World Aquatics Championships held in Gwangju, South Korea.

Personal life
Meya studied at Kyambogo University. Her father, Andrew, coached the Uganda national cricket team.

References

External links
 

1994 births
Living people
Ugandan female swimmers
Commonwealth Games competitors for Uganda
Swimmers at the 2018 Commonwealth Games
Swimmers at the 2022 Commonwealth Games
Ugandan female freestyle swimmers
African Games competitors for Uganda
Swimmers at the 2015 African Games
Kyambogo University alumni
Sportspeople from Kampala
20th-century Ugandan women
21st-century Ugandan women